Ernest Arthur Rex Pickering (23 November 1936 – 5 July 2016) was a New Zealand rugby union player. A loose forward and lock, Pickering represented Waikato at a provincial level, and was a member of the New Zealand national side, the All Blacks, from 1957 to 1960. He played 21 matches for the All Blacks including three internationals. He was described as the Sonny Bill Williams of his time.

Pickering was educated at Nelson College from 1953 to 1954. He died in Cambridge on 5 July 2016.

References

1936 births
2016 deaths
People educated at Nelson College
New Zealand rugby union players
New Zealand international rugby union players
Sportspeople from Te Kūiti
Waikato rugby union players
Rugby union locks
Rugby union players from Waikato